Carl Bradshaw may refer to:
Carl Bradshaw (actor), Jamaican actor and director
Carl Bradshaw (footballer) (born 1968), British association footballer